Big Pump, also known as Maryville Oil Co., was a historic service station located at Maryville, Nodaway County, Missouri. It was built in 1937, and was a 21-foot high, Art Deco style structure.  It had wood framing and sheet metal siding shaped to resemble a gasoline pump of the 1937 period.

It was listed on the National Register of Historic Places in 1980. It was delisted in 1994 after being relocated to King City.

References

Former National Register of Historic Places in Missouri
Gas stations on the National Register of Historic Places in Missouri
Art Deco architecture in Missouri
Commercial buildings completed in 1937
Buildings and structures in Nodaway County, Missouri
National Register of Historic Places in Nodaway County, Missouri